Ammaku Teliyani Koilamma is an Indian Telugu language crime drama thriller series aired on Star Maa from 19 July 2021 to 27 November 2021. It stars Kavya Shree, Nikhil Maliyakkal, Ashwini Gowda and Manju Bhargavi in lead roles. It is an official remake of Malayalam television series Ammayariyathe airing on Asianet. It is also available on digital streaming platform Disney+ Hotstar.

Synopsis 
Shakuntala finds her mother, Neeraja, and misunderstanding her and seeks revenge on her. Later she learns the violent circumstances of her birth from her grandmother Sulekha. Then she decides to  wreak vengeance on all who harmed Neeraja. Meanwhile, she falls in love with Prem and marries him.

Cast

Main 

 Kavya Shree as Shakuntala; Neeraja's daughter; Sulekha's grand daughter; Prem's wife; Aaradhya's sister
 Nikhil Maliyakkal as Prem; Shakuntala's husband; Shyamala's son
 Manju Bhargavi as Sulekha; Shakuntala and Aaradhya's grand mother; Sreedhar's mother in law
 Ashwini Gowda as Neeraja; Shakuntala and Aaradhya's mother; Sreedhar's wife; Sulekha's daughter

Recurring 

 Rachana Gowda as Aaradhya; Neeraja and Sreedhar's daughter; Virat's ex-lover
 Vinod Bala as Peter; Shakuntala's foster father
 Raja Sridhar as Sreedhar; Neeraja's husband; Aaradhya's father; Sulekha's son in law; Shakuntala's step father
 Chinna as Ramaswamy; Press owner
 Srilatha as Shyamala; Prem's mother; Shakuntala's mother in law; Murthy's sister
 Srinivas as Prem's father
 Surya as Ramesh Babu; Sulekha's friend; Commissioner of police
 Akhilraj Uddemari as Virat; Aaradhya's ex-lover; Shoban's son; Film actor
 Hari Krishna as Murthy; Prem's uncle; Shyamala's brother; Shoban's friend; Music director
 Vijay Reddy as Shoban; Virat's father; Murthy's friend; Film actor
 Madhuri as Ramaswamy's wife
 Chandu as Prem's friend
 Sai Kumar as Prem's friend
 Chinnu Srilatha as Shakuntala's friend
 Niranjan as Sachitandha; Murthy's friend; Police officer
 Jabardasth Dorababu as Shakuntala's bridegroom
 Lakshmi Prasanna as Shakuntala's foster grand mother; Peter's mother
 Bharani Shankar as Bhaskar; Sulekha's husband; Neeraja's father

Cameo Appearances 

 Mukesh Gowda as Rishi
 Raksha Gowda as Vasudhara
 Priyanka Jain as Janaki
 Nalini Bandi as Professor
 Shobha Raju as herself

Soundtrack

Adaptations

References

External links 

 Ammaku Teliyani Koilamma on Disney+ Hotstar

Telugu-language television shows
2021 Indian television series debuts
2021 Indian television series endings
Star Maa original programming